The 2014 KNSB Dutch Sprint Championships in speed skating were held in Amsterdam at the Olympic Stadium (Amsterdam) from 28 February to 1 March 2014. The tournament was part of the 2013–2014 speed skating season. Michel Mulder and Margot Boer won the sprint titles. The sprint championships were held together with the 2014 Dutch Allround Championships.

Schedule

Medalist

Men's sprint

Women's sprint

Classification

Men's sprint

Women's sprint

Source:

References

KNSB Dutch Sprint Championships
KNSB Dutch Sprint Championships
2014 Sprint